Alpha Lambda Zeta Fraternity, Inc., an LGBT Greek-Lettered Organization, is a national non-collegiate service fraternity for masculine-identified lesbians who seek to promote positive images of the LGBT community through service to the community and political activism. The organization was founded to provide mentorship, personal growth, and leadership. Membership in Alpha Lambda Zeta is not exclusive to women of a particular race or age. The fraternity was founded in 2006 in Houston, Texas and Atlanta, Georgia.

History
Alpha Lambda Zeta Fraternity was founded on January 9, 2006 in Houston, Texas and Atlanta, Georgia.

The fraternity operates nationally and has members in more than 10 US states such as Nevada, California, Georgia, Mississippi, Tennessee, Texas, Illinois, Maryland, New Jersey, Philadelphia, Ohio, Virginia, and Arizona.

Symbols

Colors
Wine, black and pearl

Official plant and mascot
Spruce and Rearing Black Stallion

See also
 List of LGBT fraternities and sororities

References

External links
 Official website

LGBT fraternities and sororities
Lesbian organizations in the United States
Student organizations established in 2006
2006 establishments in Texas
2006 establishments in Georgia (U.S. state)
LGBT in Texas
LGBT in Georgia (U.S. state)